Boumia may refer to:

Boumia, Algeria
Boumia, Morocco